Bertha is a 13-episode British stop motion-animated children's television series about a factory machine of that name that aired from 1985 to 1986. All the characters were designed by Ivor Wood, and the series was produced by his company, Woodland Animations. It was broadcast on BBC Television, It was intended as a replacement to the Postman Pat series, until the second series aired in 1996.

A series of five storybooks based on Bertha was published by André Deutsch at the same time as the series was broadcast. They were adapted by Eric Charles and illustrated by Steve Augarde, who was also responsible for the artwork and music in the children's series Bump.

The series was later repeated on GMTV2 in the early 2000s along with Penny Crayon.

Plot
The series is set in an industrial estate occupied by the Spottiswood & Company factory, a small manufacturing plant producing a wide range of goods ranging from cuckoo clocks to windmill money boxes. Each episode focuses on a machine called Bertha that can produce any item requested of her. In each episode, the factory experiences a crisis affecting its daily production schedule, which Bertha invariably solves with the help of her factory worker friends.

Production
Bertha was created by Woodland Animations, who also produced the shows Postman Pat, Charlie Chalk and Gran for the BBC. Episodes were written by Eric Charles and Stephen Flewers, and designed, produced and directed by Ivor Wood, co-founder of the Woodland company. Roy Kinnear and Sheila Walker voiced the characters, and Kinnear narrated. The main title music (as well as some of the other songs) featured the singing of Guy Fletcher. The songs "Tracy's Robot Song", "Mrs Tupp" and "Isn't it Nice?" from the Bertha 12-inch vinyl record feature the vocals of Stephanie de Sykes.

Main characters
 Mr. Willmake – Manager of the factory
 Miss McClackerty – Mr. Willmake's secretary
 Mr. Sprott – Chief designer
 Tracy James – Mr. Sprott's Assistant
 Mr. Duncan – Works Foreman. Sometimes the antagonist in the story, since he regards Bertha as an old inefficient machine.
 Ted Turner – Chief machine operator (who shows a number of influences of the late veteran TV presenter Bruce Forsyth)
Roy Willing – Assistant machine operator (it was never stated if he was named after the narrator Roy Kinnear)
 Mrs. Tupp – The tea lady
 Panjit Singh – Forklift truck operator, often has accidents that are no fault of his own.
 Nell - Packer
 Flo – Stacker
 Bill and Horace - Burglars. Who both resemble Ted Glen and Alf Thompson from Postman Pat.
 T.O.M. – Talk Operated Machine, a robot resembling the Star Wars character R2-D2 designed by Tracy and built by Bertha to perform odd jobs around the factory. According to the song TOM the Robot from the episode TOM's New Friend and the Bertha 12" vinyl record, he is said to be Bertha's robot son.
 Bertha - The title character, an old machine at the factory who has been modernised over the 50 years she has worked at the factory. She helps the rest of the Spottiswood & Company factory during each episode in some way or another.

Goods manufactured by Bertha throughout the series
 Musical windmill money boxes
 Garden gnomes
 Beach balls
 Nuts and bolts
 365 springs
 Inflatable plastic bears
 Plastic bath sponges
 Cuckoo clocks
 Humming tops
 Jack-in-the-boxes
 Jigsaw puzzles
 Watering cans
 Building blocks
 Jumping kangaroos
 T.O.M. (Talk Operated Machine) – a robot and Bertha’s son
 A mechanical toy soldier for a contest

Episodes and broadcast dates
The first episode of Bertha premiered on BBC1 on 1 April 1985 at 3:55pm after a 3:25pm screening of Daffy Duck's Easter Special. Episodes 2-7 were shown over the following weeks, omitting the Easter and May Day holidays, and episodes 8–11 were first broadcast at the end of an autumn rerun. The BBC did not comply with an ordered schedule for the airing of the programme, and the last two episodes premiered in 1986 during a repeat season at 1:45pm and 1:30pm. The series was regularly repeated on BBC1/2 until 1998.

List of episodes

Merchandise

Merchandise for the programme was, and is, very minimal. The merchandise listed are the only items that have been discovered.

UK VHS and DVD releases
On 13 July 1987, after the episodes were shown on TV, the BBC released one video of the show.

At some point in 1985, Bertha was featured on a Marks and Spencer (St. Michael) exclusive VHS release called Cartoon Favourites along with The Family-Ness, Ivor the Engine, Bagpuss and Pigeon Street. The "Mouse in the Works" episode of Bertha  is on this release.

On 27 November 1989 one episode of Bertha was on the VHS release which was exclusive to W.H. Smith Postman Pat and Friends alongside Postman Pat and Charlie Chalk.

On 11 November 1991, one episode of Bertha was featured on the BBC VHS release Postman Pat and Company alongside Postman Pat and Charlie Chalk.

Hallmark and Carlton Home Entertainment released the first four episodes on a single video in 1994.

In 2004 Entertainment Rights released a DVD of the show containing three of the same episodes as the Hallmark/Carlton Release, replacing "The Best Machine Competition" with "More Speed, Less Work" (albeit mistitled "The Best Machine competition").

In 2011, Classic Media released a DVD entitled Fun with Friends: Volume One containing one episode of Bertha.

Australian DVD releases

While there are no known Australian VHS releases of the programme, two DVDs of the entire series have been released by Reel Entertainment. The DVD cover claimed that the show was made by "the makers of  Postman Pat and Thomas and Friends." However, this is only true for Charlie Chalk (since the slogan was used on all the Woodland Animations DVDs in Australia), because Jocelyn Stevenson (writer of Charlie Chalk) became the executive producer on Thomas and Friends from the seventh series (2003) until the tenth series (2006).

Photobooks

In 1985, to accompany the programme, some photobooks were released with altered titles to fit the style of the books. These were very similar to the Postman Pat photobooks, where the front cover would be an original illustration and all pictures within the book were images from the TV programme.
 Bertha and the Great Painting Job (The Great Painting Job)
 Bertha and the Windmills (The Windmills)
 Bertha and the Mouse in the Works (A Mouse in the works)
 Bertha and the Best Machine Competition (The Best Machine Competition)
 Bertha and the Lost TOM (T.O.M. Gets Lost)
 Bertha and the Flying Bear (The Flying Bear)

Vinyl record
In 1986, after broadcast ended, the BBC's record label released a 12" vinyl record containing songs from the TV series.

Tracks marked with an asterisk (*) did not feature in the TV series. However, it is possible that the song "Mr. Duncan" was to feature in the episode "More Speed, Less Work" but was not included due to it making the episode too long. The same is the case with "Mr. Willmake" possibly featuring in the episode "Bertha's Birthday".

The album also had a cassette release with the reference number of ZCR 585.

Board game

In 1987, Falcon released a board game using illustrations similar to those seen on the front covers of the photobooks. The game itself does not differ much from the Monopoly series of board games. If a player lands on T.O.M., they are allowed to ask Bertha to make an item for them.

Advent calendar

In 1985, an Advent calendar using the same profile image as the vinyl record was released.

Annuals

From 1985 to 1988, Bertha featured in a total of four annuals:
 Bertha annual 1985
 Bertha annual 1986
 Buttons (based on Children's BBC) annual 1987 (along with Postman Pat, King Rollo, Towser, Henry's Cat and Jimbo and the Jet Set)
 Buttons annual 1988 (along with Postman Pat, Charlie Chalk, Henry's Cat, Towser, King Rollo and Spot)

Credits
 Written by: Eric Charles
 Narration by: Roy Kinnear
 Voices by: Roy Kinnear and Sheila Walker
 Music and lyrics by: Bryan Daly
 Director of animation: Derek Mogford
 Series designed and directed by: Ivor Wood
 Film editor: Martin Bohan
 Song vocals: Guy Fletcher
 Recorded at: Havoc House Studios
 Sound by: Clive Pendry
 Produced by: Woodland Animations Ltd
 © Woodland Animations Ltd MCMLXXXV

References

External links
 
 Little Gems
 Toonhound

BBC children's television shows
British stop-motion animated television series
1985 British television series debuts
1986 British television series endings
1980s British children's television series
British children's animated adventure television series
Television series by Universal Television
DreamWorks Classics
English-language television shows
1980s British animated television series